Taeniacara candidi is a species of cichlid fish from the Amazon Basin in South America. This species is considered a dwarf cichlid in which reaches a length of  TL.  This species can also be found in the aquarium trade, but requires very soft, acidic water and is known for being unexpectedly aggressive for a fish its size; a male will usually kill any other males in a tank shorter than 4 feet in length.

References

Geophagini
Fish of South America
Fish described in 1935
Taxa named by George S. Myers